Muwashshah (   literally means "girdled" in Classical Arabic; plural   or  ) is the name for both an Arabic poetic form and a secular musical genre. The poetic form consists of a multi-lined strophic verse poem written in classical Arabic, usually consisting of five stanzas, alternating with a refrain with a running rhyme. It was customary to open with one or two lines which matched the second part of the poem in rhyme and meter; in North Africa poets ignore the strict rules of Arabic meter while the poets in the East follow them. The musical genre of the same name uses muwaššaḥ texts as lyrics, still in classical Arabic. This tradition can take two forms: the waṣla of the Mashriq and the Arab Andalusi nubah of the western part of the Arab world.

History 
While the qasida and the maqama were adapted from the Mashriq, strophic poetry is the only form of Andalusi literature known to have its origins in the Iberian Peninsula. Andalusi strophic poetry exists in two forms: the muwaššaḥ: a more complex version in Standard Arabic with the exception of the concluding couplet, or the kharja, and zajal: a simpler form entirely in vernacular Arabic. The earliest known muwaššaḥs date back to the eleventh century.

It was exported to the east, and celebrated there by figures such as al-Jawwani and ibn Dihya al-Kalby. The corpus of muwaššaḥs is formed by pieces in Hebrew and Andalusi Arabic. Tova Rosen describes the muwaššaḥ as "a product and a microcosm of the cultural conditions particular to al-Andalus. The linguistic interplay between the standard written languages—Arabic and Hebrew—and the oral forms—Andalusi Arabic, Andalusi Romance, Hebrew, and other Romance languages—reflect the fluidity and diversity of the linguistic landscape of al-Andalus.

The earliest known source on the muwashshah is ibn Bassam’s Dhakhīra fī mahāsin ahl al-Jazīra. He ascribes the invention of the muwashshah to the 10th century blind poet Muhammad Mahmud al-Qabri or ibn ‘Abd Rabbih. Nonetheless, there are no extant muwashshah poems attributed to these authors.

The poetic form
Examples of  poetry start to appear as early as the 9th or 10th century. It is believed to come from the Arabic roots wšaḥ (وشح) which means any thing that a woman might wear on her neck from a necklace to a scarf, and the verb Tawašḥ means to wear. The underlying idea is that, as there is a single rhyme running through the refrain of each stanza, the stanzas are like objects hung from a belt.

Typically, Arabic poetry has a single meter and rhyme across the poem and is structured according to couplets, not strophes. The muwashah however, is generally divided into five stanzas with a complex rhyme scheme. Each stanza consisted of aghsan (sing: ghusn), lines with a rhyme particular to that strophe and asmat (sing: simt), lines with a rhyme shared by the rest of the poem.
Conventionally, the muwashshah opened with a matla (‘the beginning’) and closed with a kharja (‘exit’). The kharja was in a vernacular language such as colloquial Arabic or Romance. It often was voiced by a different poetic speaker.

Meter
The meter of the muwashah can be one of the classical meters defined by al-Khalil or the poet can devise a new meter. This subject is debated amongst scholars, some of whom argue for the use of a Romance metrical system based on syllable stress.

Themes
Typical themes for a muwashah include love, panegyric, and wine. Some muwashshah poems are devoted to a single theme while others combine multiple themes. One common thematic structure is love, followed by panegyric, and then love. The kharja also plays a role in elaborating the poem’s theme. At the end of a love poem, the kharja might be voiced by the beloved. The eastern muwashshah tradition includes themes such as elegy and invective. Ibn Arabi and ibn al-Ṣabbāgh composed esoteric muwashshahs that used wine and love as allegories for divine yearning.

Hebrew muwashshah
An important number of the muwashshah poems written in al-Andalus were composed in Hebrew. Hebrew muwashshah authors maintained the linguistically distinct kharja of the Arabic muwashshah and often included kharjas written in colloquial Arabic. Because of its strophic structure, it was similar to some Hebrew liturgical poetry. Starting in the 11th century, the Hebrew muwashshah was also used for religious purposes. The first extant Hebrew muwashshahs are attributed to Samuel ibn Naghrillah. Other prominent Hebrew muwashshah authors include Judah Halevi and Joseph ibn Tzaddik.

The first author to compose a devotional muwashshah was Solomon ibn Gabirol, about two centuries prior to the development of religious muwashshah poetry in Arabic. He was followed in this tradition by Moses ibn Ezra, Abraham ibn Ezra, and Judah Halevi, among others. The poems were designed for use in prayer services and were elaborated themes of particular benedictions. Unlike other Hebrew muwashshahs, the kharja of a devotional muwashshah was in Hebrew.

The musical genre
Musically, the ensemble consists of oud (lute), kamanja (spike fiddle), qanun (box zither), darabukkah (goblet drum), and daf (tambourine): the players of these instruments often double as a choir. The soloist performs only a few chosen lines of the selected text. In Aleppo multiple maqam rows (scales) and up to three awzān (rhythms) are used and modulation to neighboring maqamat was possible during the B section. Until modernization it was typical to present a complete waslah, or up to eight successive  including an instrumental introduction (sama'i or bashraf). It may end with a longa. Famous Muwashshah songs still played in the Arab World today include Lamma Bada Yatathanna and Jadaka al-Ghaithu.

Famous poets
Al-Tutili
Avempace
Avenzoar
Ibn al-Khatib
Ibn Baqi
Ibn Zamrak

Famous muwashshahs 

 "Lamma Bada Yatathanna"
 "Jadaka al-Ghaithu"

See also 
Aljamiado
Zajal
Fasıl
Malouf
Emilio García Gómez
James T. Monroe

References
Citations

Bibliography
 Benbabaali, Saadane, 1987, Poétique du muwashshah dans l'Occident musulman médiéval, thèse de 3e cycle, sous la direction de R. Arié, Paris 3, 1987.
 Benbabaali, Saadane "La plume, la voix et le plectre, avec Beihdja Rahal, Barzakh, Alger, Déc. 2008.
 Benbabaali, Saadane Bahdjat al-Nufûs fî Bahâ'i Djannât al-Andalus (l'Amour, la femme et les jardins dans la poésie andalouse) ANEP, Alger,2010
 Corriente, Federico (1997). Poesía dialectal árabe y romance en Alandalús: cejeles y xarajat de muwassahat. Madrid: Gredos. .
 Emery, Ed (2006). Muwashshah: proceedings of the Conference on Arabic and Hebrew Strophic Poetry and its Romance Parallels, School of Oriental and African Studies (SOAS), London, 8–10 October 2004. London: RN Books.
 Jones, Alan (1987). Romance Kharjas in Andalusian Arabic Muwassah poetry: a palaeographic analysis. London: Ithaca. .
 Jones, Alan & Hitchcock, Richard (1991). Studies on the Muwassah and the Kharja: proceedings of the Exeter international colloquium. Reading: Published by Ithaca for the Board of the Faculty of Oriental Studies, Oxford University. .
Touma, Habib Hassan (1996). The Music of the Arabs, trans. Laurie Schwartz. Portland, Oregon: Amadeus Press. .
 Zwartjes, Otto (1997). Love songs from al-Andalus: history, structure, and meaning of the kharja. Leiden: Brill. .
 Zwartjes, Otto & Heijkoop, Henk (2004). Muwassah, zajal, kharja: bibliography of eleven centuries of strophic poetry and music from al-Andalus and their influence on East and West. Leiden-Boston: Brill. .

 
Arab culture
Arabic music
Arabic poetry forms
Classical and art music traditions
Culture of Al-Andalus
Literary genres
Poetic forms
Song forms
Syrian music
Vocal music
Jewish literature
Islamic literature